The Men's skeet event at the 2008 Olympic Games took place on August 15 and 16 at the Beijing Shooting Range Clay Target Field.

The event consisted of two rounds: a qualifier and a final. In the qualifier, each shooter fired 5 sets of 25 shots in the set order of skeet shooting.

The top 6 shooters in the qualifying round moved on to the final round. There, they fired one additional round of 25. The total score from all 150 shots was used to determine the final ranking.

Vincent Hancock from the United States took a one-hit lead in the qualification round. In the final round, Norway's Tore Brovold, who already shared the world record with Hancock, eliminated this gap by means of a perfect 25, thus also sharing the Olympic final record of 145 hits with him. Hancock came back to win the shoot-off for the gold medal. One hit behind the duo, Anthony Terras of France won the bronze medal shoot-off against Antonis Nikolaidis, denying Cyprus its first-ever Olympic medal.

Records
Prior to this competition, the existing world and Olympic records were as follows.

Qualification round

OR Olympic record – Q Qualified for final

Final

OR Olympic record

Shooting at the 2008 Summer Olympics
Men's events at the 2008 Summer Olympics